Andrew Fleming (born 1972) is a Welsh international lawn bowler.

Bowls career
Fleming was selected to represent Wales in the 2010 Commonwealth Games in Delhi, where he competed in the triples event.

He won the fours bronze medal at the 2011 Atlantic Bowls Championships in Cyprus.

He is also a two times Welsh national champion after winning two titles at the Welsh National Bowls Championships (2006 pairs and 2008 fours).

References

1972 births
Living people
Welsh male bowls players
Bowls players at the 2010 Commonwealth Games